The Impact Grand Championship was a professional wrestling championship owned by Impact Wrestling.

History
The title was introduced at the August 13, 2016, tapings of TNA's television program Impact Wrestling, after then-TNA President Billy Corgan announced that the TNA King of the Mountain Championship would be deactivated and retired in favor for the new championship. Corgan also announced an eight-man single elimination tournament that would feature new rules that would apply to the title. The new rules would be similar to how bouts were contested in professional wrestling in Europe in which each match would consist of three timed rounds, with a team of judges to determine the outcome based on points, if there is no winner via pin or submission within the time limit. The final match of the tournament took place at Bound for Glory on October 2, with Aron Rex becoming the inaugural champion by defeating Eddie Edwards (replacement for the legitimately injured Drew Galloway).

On the January 25, 2018 Genesis episode of Impact!, Matt Sydal defeated champion Ethan Carter III in a "No Rounds, No Judges" match. Subsequent title defenses would also be contested under standard rules, no longer using rounds, points systems or judges.

On June 4, 2018, during the Slammiversary XVI press conference, Austin Aries announced that the Grand and Impact World Championship would be merged/unified.

Original rules
 Three 3 minute rounds, with special event matches going 5 minutes per round.
 10 point must system.
 Judging categories: Physicality, aggressiveness, controlling the action.
 Wins can happen anytime via pin or submission.
 If there is no winner after three rounds, a winner is decided by judge's decision.

Inaugural championship tournament (2016)

Reigns

Reigns
Aron Rex became the inaugural champion by defeating Eddie Edwards in the tournament final at 2016's Bound for Glory on October 2. Moose holds the most reigns with two, with his second reign being the longest at 174 days, while Josh Mathews' reign is the shortest at one day.

Combined reigns

References

External links 
 Impact Grand Championship at Cagematch.net

Impact Wrestling championships